Macklyn is a surname and given name. Notable people with the name include:

Macklyn Arbuckle (1866–1931), American screen and stage actor
Macklyn Warlow, character in True Blood
Allen Macklyn, character in Hands Across the Table
Dr. Macklyn, character in Sick Abed